The Women's team sprint competition at the 2020 World Single Distances Speed Skating Championships was held on February 13, 2020.

Results
The race was started at 15:20.

References

Women's team sprint